Raymunida erythrina is a species of squat lobster in the family Munididae from the Pacific and Indian oceans. The species can be distinguished by its morphological characters (subtle morphological characters, such as length of the mesial spine on the basal antennal segment, the length of its walking legs, and color pattern) and its mitochondrial cytochrome c oxidase subunit I sequences.

References

Further reading

Osawa, Masayuki. "The identity of Raymunida elegantissima (Crustacea: Decapoda: Anomura: Galatheidae) and description of a closely related new species from Japan." Species Diversity 10 (2005): 85-104.
Lin, Chia-Wei, Tin-Yam Chan, and Ka Hou Chu. "A new squat lobster of the genus Raymunida (Decapoda: Galatheidae) from Taiwan." Journal of Crustacean Biology 24.1 (2004): 149-156.
Miller, Derryl. "DNA barcoding parasite organisms found in terrestrial mammal scat using COI sequence data."

External links

Squat lobsters
Crustaceans described in 2001